Lewis Milne (born 26 April 1994) is a Scottish footballer who plays as a midfielder for Montrose. Milne has previously played for Cowdenbeath, Forfar Athletic and Raith Rovers.

Career
Born in Edinburgh, Milne began his footballing career at Dunfermline Athletic, playing for the club's youth setup in 2007–08 season. He then signed with Cowdenbeath in October 2008, playing in their youth setup and signing a professional deal in July 2010. On 7 May 2011 he made his first team debut, playing the last 24 minutes in a 0–3 away loss against Ross County. In March 2012 Milne signed a new two-year deal with Cowdenbeath. He scored his first professional goal on 6 October, in a 1–1 away draw against Livingston.

After 8 years at Central Park, Milne signed for Forfar Athletic in June 2016. Milne spent one season with Forfar, before deciding to move to Australia. Milne returned from Australia in November 2017, signing a short-term deal with Forfar. After this expired, he moved to Angus rivals Montrose at the beginning of January 2018.

Milne left Montrose to go full-time with Raith Rovers, but he did not hold down a regular first-team place with the Kirkcaldy club. He returned to Montrose in January 2019.

References

External links

1994 births
Living people
Footballers from Edinburgh
Scottish footballers
Association football midfielders
Dunfermline Athletic F.C. players
Cowdenbeath F.C. players
Forfar Athletic F.C. players
Montrose F.C. players
Scottish Football League players
Scottish Professional Football League players
Raith Rovers F.C. players